Dimethylthiocarbamoyl chloride is an organosulfur compound with the formula (CH3)2NC(S)Cl.  A yellow solid, it is often encountered as a yellow syrup.  It is a key reagent in the synthesis of arylthiols via the Newman-Kwart rearrangement.

Synthesis and reactions
Representative of other thiocarbamoyl chlorides, dimethylthiocarbamoyl chloride is electrophilic, serving as a source of R2NC(S)+.  It is analogous to dimethylcarbamoyl chloride (R2NC(O)Cl). 

Dimethylthiocarbamoyl chloride is prepared by chlorination of the related tetramethylthiuram disulfide:
[Me2NC(S)]2S2  +  3 Cl2   →     2 Me2NC(S)Cl  +  2 SCl2

Dimethylthiocarbamoyl chloride reacts with dithiocarbamates (R2NCS) to give thiuram sulfides [R2NC(S)]2S.  With methanethiolate, it gives methyl dimethyldithiocarbamate (Me2NC(S)SMe).

References

Thiochlorides